The Voice of Germany is a German reality talent show that premiered its sixth season on October 20, 2016 on ProSieben and Sat.1. Based on the reality singing competition The Voice of Holland, the series was created by Dutch television producer John de Mol. It is part of an international series. The Judges for this season are Andreas Bourani, Samu Haber, Michi Beck & Smudo and Yvonne Catterfeld. The host(s) for this season will be Thore Schölermann and Lena Gercke.

Final

Contestants, who appeared in previous seasons
 Florian Pfitzner participated in season 4, but no coach turned for him

External links
 Official website on ProSieben.de
 The Voice of Germany on fernsehserien.de

2016 German television seasons
6